This is a list of the original fellows of the Royal Society, defined as those fellows, excepting the founder fellows, who were elected prior to July 1663. Most were appointed on 20 May or 22 June 1663.

Fellows 

 John Alleyn
 James Annesley, 2nd Earl of Anglesey
 Elias Ashmole
 John Aubrey
 John Austen
 Sir Thomas Baines
 Peter Ball
 Isaac Barrow
 George Bate
 George Berkeley, 1st Earl of Berkeley and Viscount Dursley
 Sir John Birkenhead
 Richard Boyle
 William Brereton, 3rd Baron Brereton
 Sir John Brooke
 David Bruce
 Sir Edward Bysshe
 William Cavendish, 1st Duke of Devonshire
 Walter Charlton
 Timothy Clarke
 Sir John Clayton
 Daniel Colwall
 James Compton, 3rd Earl of Northampton
 Edward Cotton
 Thomas Coxe
 John Crawford-Lindsay, 17th Earl of Crawford
 William Croone
 Sir John Denham
 Sir Kenelm Digby
 John Dryden
 Andrew Ellis
 Sir George Ent
 William Erskine
 John Evelyn
 Sir Francis Fane
 Nicasius le Febure
 Sir John Finch
 John Gauden
 Francis Glisson
 Theodore Haak
 William Hammond
 Sir Robert Harley
 Christopher Hatton, 1st Baron Hatton
 Sir James Hayes
 Nathaniel Henshaw
 Thomas Henshaw
 William Hoare
 William Holder
 Robert Hooke
 Sir John Hoskins
 Charles Howard
 Christian Huyghens
 Richard Jones, 1st Earl of Ranelagh
 Sir Andrew King
 Sir James Long
 Anthony Lowther
 John Lucas, 1st Baron Lucas of Shenfield
 Christopher Merrett
 Edward Montagu, 1st Earl of Sandwich and Viscount Hinchinbroke
 Sir Anthony Morgan
 Caspar Needham
 William Neile
 Sir Thomas Nott
 Henry Oldenburg
 Philip Packer
 Dudley Palmer
 Robert Paston, 1st Earl of Yarmouth
 John Pell
 Sir William Persall
 Peter Pett
 Sir Peter Pett
 Henry Pierrepont, 1st Marquess of Dorchester
 Thomas Pockley
 Walter Pope
 Thomas Povey
 Henry Powle
 Sir Richard Powle
 Henry Proby
 William Quatremain
 Giles Rawlins
 Sir Charles Scarburgh
 William Schroter
 Sir James Shaen
 Henry Slingsby
 George Smyth
 Sir Robert Southwell
 Thomas Sprat
 Alexander Stanhope
 Thomas Stanley
 Sir Gilbert Talbot
 Christopher Terne
 Sir Samuel Tuke
 Cornelius Vermuyden
 George Villiers, 2nd Duke of Buckingham
 Edmund Waller
 John Wallis
 Seth Ward
 Daniel Whistler
 Sir Joseph Williamson
 Francis Willughby
 John Winthrop
 Matthew Wren
 Thomas Wren
 Sir Cyril Wyche
 Sir Peter Wyche
 Edmund Wylde
 William Wynde

References

1659